The Bristol derby is the name given to football matches played between Bristol City and Bristol Rovers (a "local derby"). The fans of each club both consider the other to be their main rivals, leading to a heated atmosphere at these matches. The majority of the meetings between the teams have been in the Football League, and they used to meet annually in the Gloucestershire Cup.

The Bristol derby was deemed 8th fiercest rivalry in English football in an in-depth report by the Football Pools in 2008.

History
The first meeting of what would become a fierce rivalry took place on 22 September 1894, when newly formed Bristol South End (later to be renamed Bristol City) hosted a friendly match with Eastville Rovers (later Bristol Rovers) at their ground at St John's Lane in Bedminster. The Southerners, perhaps surprisingly, defeated their more established opponents 2–1. After a further number of friendly matches, the teams had their first competitive meeting when they were drawn together in the 1895–96 Gloucestershire Cup. This time Rovers, who had the home advantage at their Ridgeway ground, were the victors with an emphatic 4–0 defeat of South End, in what was reported to have been a very physical encounter:

The following season the teams met in league competition for the first time when South End joined the Western League, winning 2–0 away to Rovers on 26 September 1896. In 1897 South End renamed themselves Bristol City and played in both the Southern League and the now-professional Western League, but opted to leave the Western League a year later. Rovers meanwhile split their seasons between the Birmingham & District League and Western League, not joining the Southern League until 1899, meaning there were no league matches played between the clubs during the 1898–99 season.

In the summer of 1900, City merged with local rivals Bedminster F.C., with the new club retaining the name and identity of the original Bristol City. Rovers and City spent just two seasons together in the Southern League before City successfully applied for election to The Football League in 1901, leading to a 21-year gap before they would play in the same division again.

Games between the two teams, like the majority of local derbies in English football, have resulted in a number of football hooliganism incidents. In a match between the clubs in December 1996, pitch invasions by both sets of fans culminated in reports of Rovers players being "assaulted" by City fans. Some fans of both teams have even been known to avoid attending derby matches because of fears of violence.

The most recent match between the two sides came on 4 September 2013 in the Johnstone's Paint Trophy first round at City's Ashton Gate Stadium. The game finished 2–1 to City. The match, which was broadcast live on Sky Sports, was overshadowed by a post match pitch invasion by a number of Bristol City supporters, leading to 60 arrests being made and three police officers injured.

All-time results
The table below shows the results of all competitive matches between Bristol City and Bristol Rovers. The teams have faced each other in The Football League, FA Cup, Football League Cup, Football League Trophy (formerly known as the Associate Members' Cup), Gloucestershire Cup, Third Division South Cup, Southern Football League and Western Football League, as well as in a number of wartime competitions held while normal League football was suspended.

. All Football League, FA Cup, League Cup and Football League Trophy results, and attendance figures since 2003 from 11v11.com. Other results and pre-2003 attendance figures from Byrne & Jay (2003). Friendly matches are not included in this table.

 Rovers won the 1994 Gloucestershire Cup 11–10 on penalties. Score was 0–0 after extra time.
 Rovers won the 1993 Gloucestershire Cup 5–3 on penalties. Score was 0–0 after 90 minutes; 1–1 after extra time.
 City won the 1972–73 Gloucestershire Cup on penalties.
 Although Rovers were officially the home team for the wartime South-West League game played on 30 December 1939, the match was played at Ashton Gate.
 The final of the 1898–99 Gloucestershire Cup was held at a neutral venue, at the home of Bristol St George.

Summary of results

Matches between Rovers and Bedminster
This table shows all competitive meetings between Bristol Rovers (who also played under the names Bristol Eastville Rovers and Eastville Rovers) and Bedminster, covering the period from the beginning of league football in Bristol in 1892 until Bedminster's merger into Bristol City in 1900.

Crossing the divide

Players for both sides
A large number of players have played for both City and Rovers since the clubs were formed in the 19th Century. The most recent player to move directly between the two clubs was Matty Taylor who joined City from Rovers on 31 January 2017. A list of the most significant players to represent both sides of the city is shown below. To be included in this list a player must have made at least 50 appearances in the Football League for both clubs.

† = Players who are capped at full international level.

Managers for both sides
Four managers have taken charge of both sides in a Bristol Derby: Joe Palmer, Fred Ford, Terry Cooper and John Ward. Palmer and Ford both managed City first, then later went to Rovers, while Cooper moved in the opposite direction. Ward had two spells as Rovers manager, which were either side of his time at City.

The table below shows the record of each of these managers in Bristol Derbies.

Note: Russell Osman also managed both teams, but didn't take part in any Bristol derbies while in charge of Rovers.

References

England football derbies
Football in Bristol
Bristol City F.C.
Bristol Rovers F.C.
Sports competitions in Bristol